Carter Lake is a shallow oxbow lake in Nebraska and Iowa, located next to Omaha and Carter Lake in the United States. Soon after its formation the lake was called the East Omaha Lake, and then Lake Nakoma.

History
Carter Lake is a former channel of the Missouri River and was formed in the summer of 1877. The city of Carter Lake, Iowa takes its name from the lake. The lake was formed from the Saratoga Bend in the Missouri River.

The Saratoga Bend was the impetus for the creation of the town of Saratoga, Nebraska Territory, a short mile from the river. However, the Bend was cut off from the river after a flood in 1877. A beach resort with a large boathouse and two-story pavilion, a Rod and Gun Club, and a YMCA camp had all settled on the shores of Lake Nakoma by 1906.

The Carter Lake and Levi Carter Park at 3100 Abbott Drive were named after one of Omaha's original industrialists named Levi Carter, who ran a white lead smelter in the area.

See also

East Omaha, Nebraska
Carter Lake, Iowa
Saratoga, Nebraska Territory
History of North Omaha, Nebraska

References

External links
History of Carter Lake with pictures and maps
Historical photo of canoeing and of the Omaha Rod & Gun Club Cabins at Lake Nakoma (Carter Lake)

Geography of Omaha, Nebraska
Bodies of water of Pottawattamie County, Iowa
Bodies of water of Douglas County, Nebraska
Landmarks in North Omaha, Nebraska
Oxbow lakes of the United States
Lakes of Iowa
Lakes of Nebraska
Parks in Omaha, Nebraska
Missouri River
Defunct resorts
Borders of Iowa
Borders of Nebraska